was a private women's junior college in Fujiidera, Osaka, Japan. It was established in 1955. closed in 2018.

References

External links 
  in Japanese

Japanese junior colleges
Private universities and colleges in Japan
Educational institutions established in 1955
Universities and colleges in Osaka Prefecture
1955 establishments in Japan
Fujiidera